Disco Fever, also known as Jukebox, is a 1978 American film directed by Lamar Card about a nightclub owner who plans the comeback of an ex-teen idol.

Plot
Cybil Michaels is the manager of a disco. One night she spots Richie Desmond, a contemporary of Frankie Avalon and Fabian, who has come in for a drink. She proposes he make a comeback attempt and Richie is interested, but he rejects her sexual overtures.

Richie falls for Jill but has to deal with Jill's jealous ex, Danny, and the manager. The manager wants to launch a disco singer, Tommy Aspen, at a party which is going to take place on a plane that has been fitted with a stage.

Richie wants to sing new material and Cybil assures him she is supportive. She offers up a new contract and bribes Richie's manager, Brian Parker, to get Richie to sign the contract. Richie does so at Brian's urging.

Cybil then tells Richie he must play his old material on the plane. Richie is upset but Cybil points out she has full creative control over his career for the next seven years.

On the plane Richie arrives and performs his new song, to the chagrin of Tommy. It is a big success.

Cast
Fabian as Richie Desmond
Casey Kasem as Brian Parker
Phoebe Dorin as Cybil Michaels
Susette Carroll as Renny Lawrence
Rick Goldman as Ned Stiner
Michael Blodgett as Tommy Aspen
Tanya George as Connie
Kate Netter as Jill
George Barris "King of the Kustomizers" as himself
Shirley Barris as herself
Irwin Schaeffer as himself
Tanya Lemani as Celeste
Joel Kramer as Danny
Stephanie Black as Brenda
Joji Barris as Michelle
Shotzi Barris as Frank
Jack Parker as Lawyer Schaeffer 
Eduardo Nieto
Deborah North

Production
The film was based on a story by George Barris, who also produced. Barris was best known as a car customiser whose work often appeared in films. He would occasionally produce movies.

It was known during filming as Jet Set Disco.

Songs
"Moving on" - Composed and Arranged by Jack Allocco (as Jack Allen Allocco)
"My Turn to Fly" - Composed by Gary Verna and Jack Allocco (as Jack Allen Allocco), Arranged by Jack Allocco (as Jack Allen Allocco)
"Carry on, Carry on" - Composed by Gary Verna and Jack Allocco (as Jack Allen Allocco), Arranged by Jack Allocco (as Jack Allen Allocco)
"Till I Get Through to You", Composed by Gene Nelson (as Gene) and Paul Nelson, Arranged by Jack Allocco (as Jack Allen Allocco)
"Rain Dance' Written by Kathy Kurasch and Suzi Maddox

Reception
One critic said "Fabian is totally unconvincing... obviously the money men couldn't afford good script writers, a variety of sets or even good, reliable actors."

References

External links

Disco Fever at Letterbox DVD
Disco Fever at BFI

1978 films
1978 drama films
American drama films
1970s English-language films
1970s American films